DYLC (94.1 FM), broadcasting as 94.1 Love Radio, is a radio station owned and operated by Manila Broadcasting Company through its licensee Cebu Broadcasting Company. Its studio and transmitter are located at #102 National Highway, Brgy. Cawayan, Catarman, Northern Samar.

References

Radio stations established in 2015
Radio stations in Northern Samar
Love Radio Network stations